Chris Villarrial (born June 9, 1973) is an American football coach and former player.  He is the current head football coach at Saint Francis University in Loretto, Pennsylvania. He played professionally as an offensive guard with the Chicago Bears and Buffalo Bills in the National Football League (NFL) for 11 seasons. He played college football at Indiana University of Pennsylvania (IUP).

College career
After redshirting his first year at IUP, Villarrial began his college career as a reserve nose guard until moving to offensive right tackle midway through his freshman season. While playing for IUP, Villarrial was a three-year All-American and three-year all-conference player. He played in the 1993 Division II national championship game, and received the Jim Langer Award for Best Lineman in Division II in 1996. Villarrial had his college jersey No. 75 retired by IUP.

Professional career
Villarrial was drafted in the fifth round (152nd overall) by Dave Wannstedt in April 1996. Prior to the draft, Villarrial broke the NFL Combine Bench Press Record. As a member of the Chicago Bears from to 1996 to 2003, Villarrial played six seasons under head coach Dick Jauron and was a two-year All-Pro player in addition to being named to the All-Joe Team. He paved the way for a 1,000-yard rusher every season, blocked for Anthony Thomas, who was the NFL Offensive Rookie of the Year in 2001, and was a member of an offensive line that gave up the fewest sacks in the NFL in 2001, when the Bears advanced to the NFC Divisional Playoff Game. He also received the Golden Bear Award, which was given to the rookie who has perfect attendance in the weight room.

Villarrial was one of the most sought out free agents in Buffalo Bills history for head coach Mike Mularkey, and continued his streak of 1,000-yard rushers every season with the Bills. He was a member of an offensive line that gave up the fewest sacks in franchise history. Villarrial, who also played two seasons in Buffalo under coach Jauron, finished his NFL career with 148 starts.

Coaching career
Following his professional career, Villarrial returned to Ebensburg, PA, where he served two seasons as the offensive coordinator for the Central Cambria High School football team. He led the team to two district title games, and personally helped 13 players continue their playing careers at the collegiate level, while developing and implementing a successful strength and conditioning program.

In late 2009, Villarrial became head coach of the Saint Francis Red Flash football team. The Red Flash compete in the Northeast Conference of NCAA Division I FCS. He had previously served as the offensive coordinator for one season.

Head coaching record

References

External links
 Saint Francis profile
 

1973 births
Living people
American football offensive guards
Buffalo Bills players
Chicago Bears players
IUP Crimson Hawks football players
Saint Francis Red Flash football coaches
People from Hummelstown, Pennsylvania
Coaches of American football from Pennsylvania
Players of American football from Pennsylvania